The 1931 San Jose State Spartans football team represented State Teachers College at San Jose during the 1931 college football season.

San Jose State competed in the Far Western Conference (FWC). The team was led by third-year head coach Mush Crawford, and they played home games at Spartan Field in San Jose, California. The team finished the season with a record of one win and eight losses (1–8, 0–5 FWC). The Spartans were outscored by their opponents 20–126 for the season, and were shut out in eight of the nine games.

Schedule

Notes

References

San Jose State
San Jose State Spartans football seasons
San Jose State Spartans football